César Nahuel Araújo Vilches (born 2 April 2001) is a Uruguayan professional footballer who plays as a midfielder for MLS club Orlando City.

Club career

Montevideo Wanderers
Growing up in Cerrito, Montevideo, Araújo played for youth club Marconi FC before joining the academy at Montevideo Wanderers. On 1 August 2019, Araújo made his professional debut as a 68th-minute substitute in a 2–1 defeat to Brazilian side Corinthians in the 2019 Copa Sudamericana round of 16. He didn't make another senior appearance for 12 months until substituting on for his Uruguayan Primera División debut on 9 August 2020 in a 2–0 win against Boston River. At the end of the 2021 season, Araújo was named on the bench in the Primera División Team of the Year. He was also named Wanderers' Player of the Year in 2021.

Orlando City
On 7 January 2022, Araújo transferred to Major League Soccer team Orlando City for a reported $2,000,000 fee. He signed a three-year contract with an additional option year and joined as part of the new MLS U22 initiative. Having never previously scored a goal in his senior club career spanning 88 matches, Araújo scored his first goals on 27 July 2022 when he netted twice during a 5–1 victory over New York Red Bulls in a 2022 U.S. Open Cup semifinal.

International career
Araújo was named to multiple Uruguay under-20 training camps in 2020 and 2021.

On 7 January 2022, Araújo received his first senior Uruguay national team call-up as part of a 50-player preliminary roster for 2022 FIFA World Cup qualifiers. On 21 October 2022, he was named in Uruguay's 55-man preliminary squad for the 2022 FIFA World Cup.

Personal life
Araújo has five siblings. His oldest brother, Maximiliano Araújo, is also a professional footballer for Puebla.

Career statistics

Club

Honours

Club
Orlando City
U.S. Open Cup: 2022

References

External links
 

2001 births
Living people
Footballers from Montevideo
Association football midfielders
Uruguayan footballers
Uruguay youth international footballers
Uruguayan Primera División players
Major League Soccer players
Montevideo Wanderers F.C. players
Orlando City SC players
Uruguayan expatriate footballers
Uruguayan expatriate sportspeople in the United States
Expatriate soccer players in the United States